Tuktarkul (Tuqtarkül) is a rural locality (a village) in Buzdyaksky Selsoviet, Buzdyaksky District, Bashkortostan, Russia. The population was 55 as of 2010. There is 1 street.

Geography 
Tuktarkul is located 10 km east of Buzdyak (the district's administrative centre) by road. Sergeyevka is the nearest rural locality.

References 

Rural localities in Buzdyaksky District